James, Jim, Jimmy or Jamie Jacobs may refer to:

People
James B. Jacobs (born 1947), American legal scholar and law professor
James Jacobs (game designer) (born 1972), American author and designer of role-playing games
Jamie Jacobs (footballer) (born 1997), Dutch football player
Jim Jacobs (born 1942), American musical theatre writer, composer, lyricist and actor 
Jim Jacobs (customizer), American hot rodder and customizer
Jimmy Jacobs (born 1984), stage name of American wrestler 
Jimmy Jacobs (handballer) (1930–1988), American handball player and boxing manager

Fictional character
Jamie Jacobs, the second Phantom Rider

See also
Jacobs (surname)